Alen Petrović (born 5 November 1969) is a Croatian former football defender and sporting director.

He spent most of his career in Croatia's Prva HNL top level league, with the exception of two season-long stints at Portuguese side C.F. Os Belenenses and Germany's VfL Bochum.

Career
Petrović's professional debut came in the 1989–90 Yugoslav First League for the Croatian side NK Osijek, where he immediately established himself as a regular member of the starting eleven. After spending five seasons with Osijek and one season at Belenenses in Portugal he was picked up by the Croatian powerhouse NK Dinamo Zagreb (at the time known as "Croatia Zagreb") in 1995.

His time at Croatia proved to be very successful as the squad won three consecutive domestic Doubles between 1996 and 1998 and reached the 1997–98 UEFA Cup Round of 16 in which they were knocked out by Atlético Madrid 2–1 on aggregate. In 1998, he tried his luck abroad once again and spent a season with VfL Bochum in Germany but he never managed to break into the first team – he appeared in only seven games for Bochum in the 1998–99 Bundesliga before the club was relegated from top level at the end of season. He then returned to Croatia and had stints with NK Slaven Belupo and NK Osijek before retirement.

Shortly after retiring he was appointed director of football at NK Osijek in June 2005, a post he held until his contract was terminated by mutual consent in August 2009.

He spent his second period as sporting director in NK Osijek from February 2016 to September 2020.  He has been the longest-running sporting director of NK Osijek since the HNL was founded.

From his work in NK Osijek he is well known for his ability to sign players for low-cost, then later selling them at great profit to Europe's elite clubs, all whilst NK Osijek continued to advance domestically and compete in UEFA Europa league.  During his stay, he manage to hire quality players and achieve record sales and ensure cash flow through record transfers (the money spent on arrivals increased sevenfold after the players were sold). He also helped produce many players which would later play in A national teams like : Barišić, Škorić, Marić, Ivušić (Croatia), Ejupi (Macedonia), Kleinheisler (Hungary), Ndockyt (Congo) and U21 national team: Šutalo, Žaper, Beljo (Croatia). 

He hired players from clubs such as Dinamo Zagreb, Olympiacos, Getafe, Alaves, Anderlecht and the players were sold to clubs that are at the top of their leagues: Atalanta, Glasgow Rangers, FC Copenhagen, Rapid Vienna, SC Braga, FC Monza. Many of the players he signed have increased their value, such as his latest signing Mierez, who became the best goal scorer of the league and whose price is now estimated around 10M euros.

Career statistics

References

External links
 

1969 births
Living people
Sportspeople from Osijek
Association football defenders
Yugoslav footballers
Yugoslavia under-21 international footballers
Croatian footballers
NK Osijek players
C.F. Os Belenenses players
GNK Dinamo Zagreb players
VfL Bochum players
NK Slaven Belupo players
NK Marsonia players
Yugoslav First League players
Croatian Football League players
Primeira Liga players
Bundesliga players
Croatian expatriate footballers
Croatian expatriate sportspeople in Portugal
Expatriate footballers in Portugal
Croatian expatriate sportspeople in Germany
Expatriate footballers in Germany